The Casa del Tesoro or Treasure House was a building next to the former Royal Alcázar of Madrid.

References

External links
Archaeologists discovered buried facades of the Casa del Tesoro and an Islamic foundation, all this gave an idea of the extent of the building

Demolished buildings and structures in Madrid
Buildings and structures in Spain demolished during the Peninsular War
Buildings and structures completed in the 16th century
Philip II of Spain
Buildings and structures demolished in the 19th century